Lamech may refer to:

 Lamech (descendant of Cain)
 Lamech (father of Noah)
 Félix Chemla Lamèch (1894 – 1962), French meteorologist and selenographer.
 Lamèch (crater), a small lunar impact crater named after him